Concerning the lunar month of approximately 29.53 days as viewed from Earth, the lunar phase or Moon phase is the shape of the Moon's directly sunlit portion, which can be expressed quantitatively using areas or angles, or described qualitatively using the terminology of the four major phases (new moon, first quarter, full moon, last quarter) and four minor phases (waxing crescent, waxing gibbous, waning gibbous, and waning crescent).

The lunar phases gradually change over a synodic month as the orbital positions of the Moon around Earth, and Earth around the Sun, shift. The visible side of the Moon is variously sunlit, depending on the position of the Moon in its orbit, with the sunlit portion varying from 0% (at new moon) to 100% (at full moon).

Each of the four major lunar phases is approximately 7.4 days (6.58–8.24 days), the variation being due to the elliptical shape of the Moon's orbit.

Phases of the Moon

There are four principal (primary, or major) lunar phases: the new moon, first quarter, full moon, and last quarter (also known as third or final quarter), when the Moon's ecliptic longitude is at an angle to the Sun (as viewed from the center of the Earth) of 0°, 90°, 180°, and 270° respectively. Each of these phases appears at slightly different times at different locations on Earth, and tabulated times are therefore always geocentric (calculated for the Earth's center).

Between the principal phases are intermediate phases, during which the Moon's apparent shape is either crescent or gibbous. On average, the intermediate phases last one-quarter of a synodic month, or 7.38 days. 

The term waxing is used for an intermediate phase when the Moon's apparent shape is thickening, from new to a full moon; and waning when the shape is thinning.

A new moon appears highest on the summer solstice and lowest on the winter solstice.
A first quarter moon appears highest on the spring equinox and lowest on the autumn equinox.
A full moon appears highest on the winter solstice and lowest on the summer solstice.
A last quarter moon appears highest on the autumn equinox and lowest on the spring equinox.
Non-Western cultures may use a different number of lunar phases; for example, traditional Hawaiian culture has a total of 30 phases (one per day).

Lunar libration

As seen from Earth, the Moon's eccentric orbit makes it both slightly change its apparent size, and to be seen from slightly different angles. The effect is subtle to the naked eye, from night to night, yet somewhat obvious in time-lapse photography.

Lunar libration causes part of the back side of the Moon to be visible to a terrestrial observer some of the time. Because of this, around 59% of the Moon's surface has been imaged from the ground.

Principal and intermediate phases of the Moon

Waxing and waning

When the Sun and Moon are aligned on the same side of the Earth, the Moon is "new", and the side of the Moon facing Earth is not illuminated by the Sun. As the Moon waxes (the amount of illuminated surface as seen from Earth increases), the lunar phases progress through new moon, crescent moon, first-quarter moon, gibbous moon, and full moon. The Moon then wanes as it passes through the gibbous moon, third-quarter moon, crescent moon, and back to new moon.

The terms old moon and new moon are not interchangeable. The "old moon" is a waning sliver (which eventually becomes undetectable to the naked eye) until the moment it aligns with the Sun and begins to wax, at which point it becomes new again. Half moon is often used to mean the first- and third-quarter moons, while the term quarter refers to the extent of the Moon's cycle around the Earth, not its shape.

When an illuminated hemisphere is viewed from a certain angle, the portion of the illuminated area that is visible will have a two-dimensional shape as defined by the intersection of an ellipse and circle (in which the ellipse's major axis coincides with the circle's diameter). If the half-ellipse is convex with respect to the half-circle, then the shape will be gibbous (bulging outwards), whereas if the half-ellipse is concave with respect to the half-circle, then the shape will be a crescent. When a crescent moon occurs, the phenomenon of earthshine may be apparent, where the night side of the Moon dimly reflects indirect sunlight reflected from Earth.

Orientation by latitude

In the Northern Hemisphere, if the left (east) side of the Moon is dark, then the bright part is thickening, and the Moon is described as waxing (shifting toward full moon). If the right (west) side of the Moon is dark, then the bright part is thinning, and the Moon is described as waning (past full and shifting toward new moon). Assuming that the viewer is in the Northern Hemisphere, the right side of the Moon is the part that is always waxing. (That is, if the right side is dark, the Moon is becoming darker; if the right side is lit, the Moon is getting brighter.)

In the Southern Hemisphere, the Moon is observed from a perspective inverted, or rotated 180°, to that of the Northern and to all of the images in this article, so that the opposite sides appear to wax or wane.

Closer to the Equator, the lunar terminator will appear horizontal during the morning and evening. Since the above descriptions of the lunar phases only apply at middle or high latitudes, observers moving towards the tropics from northern or southern latitudes will see the Moon rotated anti-clockwise or clockwise with respect to the images in this article.

The lunar crescent can open upward or downward, with the "horns" of the crescent pointing up or down, respectively. When the Sun appears above the Moon in the sky, the crescent opens downward; when the Moon is above the Sun, the crescent opens upward. The crescent Moon is most clearly and brightly visible when the Sun is below the horizon, which implies that the Moon must be above the Sun, and the crescent must open upward. This is therefore the orientation in which the crescent Moon is most often seen from the tropics. The waxing and waning crescents look very similar. The waxing crescent appears in the western sky in the evening, and the waning crescent in the eastern sky in the morning.

Earthshine

When the Moon as seen from Earth is a thin crescent, Earth as viewed from the Moon is almost fully lit by the Sun. Often, the dark side of the Moon is dimly illuminated by indirect sunlight reflected from Earth, but is bright enough to be easily visible from Earth. This phenomenon is called earthshine and sometimes picturesquely described as "the old moon in the new moon's arms" or "the new moon in the old moon's arms".

Calendar

The shortest cycle was on 20 July 1978 and took 29.27 days to complete. The longest forecast cycle will take place on 19 January 2049 and it will take 29.83 days. Therefore, the timing of the lunar phases shifts by an average of almost one day for each successive month. (A lunar year lasts about 354 or 355 days.)

Photographing the Moon's phase every day for a month (starting in the evening after sunset, and repeating roughly 24 hours and 50 minutes later, and ending in the morning before sunrise) and arranging the series of photos on a calendar would create a composite image like the example calendar (May 8 – June 6, 2005). May 20 is blank because a picture would be taken before midnight on May 19 and the next after midnight on May 21.

Similarly, on a calendar listing moonrise or moonset times, some days will appear to be skipped. When moonrise precedes midnight one night, the next moonrise will follow midnight on the next night (so too with moonset). The "skipped day" is just a feature of the Moon's eastward movement in relation to the Sun, which at most latitudes, causes the Moon to rise later each day. The Moon follows a predictable orbit every month.

Calculating phase

Each of the four intermediate phases lasts approximately seven days (7.38 days on average), but varies ±11.25% due to lunar apogee and perigee.

The number of days counted from the time of the new moon is the Moon's "age". Each complete cycle of phases is called a "lunation".

The approximate age of the Moon, and hence the approximate phase, can be calculated for any date by calculating the number of days since a known new moon (such as January 1, 1900 or August 11, 1999) and reducing this modulo 29.53059 days (the mean length of a synodic month). The difference between two dates can be calculated by subtracting the Julian day number of one from that of the other, or there are simpler formulae giving (for instance) the number of days since December 31, 1899. However, this calculation assumes a perfectly circular orbit and makes no allowance for the time of day at which the new moon occurred and therefore may be incorrect by several hours. (It also becomes less accurate the larger the difference between the required date and the reference date). It is accurate enough to use in a novelty clock application showing lunar phase, but specialist usage taking account of lunar apogee and perigee requires a more elaborate calculation.

Effect of parallax 

The Earth subtends an angle of about two degrees when seen from the Moon. This means that an observer on Earth who sees the Moon when it is close to the eastern horizon sees it from an angle that is about 2 degrees different from the line of sight of an observer who sees the Moon on the western horizon. The Moon moves about 12 degrees around its orbit per day, so, if these observers were stationary, they would see the phases of the Moon at times that differ by about one-sixth of a day, or 4 hours. But in reality, the observers are on the surface of the rotating Earth, so someone who sees the Moon on the eastern horizon at one moment sees it on the western horizon about 12 hours later. This adds an oscillation to the apparent progression of the lunar phases. They appear to occur more slowly when the Moon is high in the sky than when it is below the horizon. The Moon appears to move jerkily, and the phases do the same. The amplitude of this oscillation is never more than about four hours, which is a small fraction of a month. It does not have any obvious effect on the appearance of the Moon. It does however affect accurate calculations of the times of lunar phases.

Misconceptions

Orbital period 
It can be confusing that the moon’s orbital period is 27.3 days while the phases complete a cycle once every 29.5 days. This is due to the Earth’s orbit around the Sun. The Moon orbits the Earth 13.4 times a year, but only passes between the Earth and Sun 12.4 times.

Eclipses 

It might be expected that once every month, when the Moon passes between Earth and the Sun during a new moon, its shadow would fall on Earth causing a solar eclipse, but this does not happen every month. Nor is it true that during every full moon, the Earth's shadow falls on the Moon, causing a lunar eclipse. Solar and lunar eclipses are not observed every month because the plane of the Moon's orbit around the Earth is tilted by about 5° with respect to the plane of Earth's orbit around the Sun (the plane of the ecliptic). Thus, when new and full moons occur, the Moon usually lies to the north or south of a direct line through the Earth and Sun. Although an eclipse can only occur when the Moon is either new (solar) or full (lunar), it must also be positioned very near the intersection of Earth's orbital plane about the Sun and the Moon's orbital plane about the Earth (that is, at one of its nodes). This happens about twice per year, and so there are between four and seven eclipses in a calendar year. Most of these eclipses are partial; total eclipses of the Moon or Sun are less frequent.

See also 
 
 
 
 . (Also known as a "lunation".)

Footnotes

References

Citations

Sources

External links 
Fred Espenak, Six Millennium Catalog of Phases of the Moon: Moon Phases from -1999 to +4000 (2000 BCE to 4000 CE).

 
Observational astronomy
Technical factors of astrology
Articles containing video clips